Oxyopes scalaris, the western lynx spider, is a species of lynx spider in the family Oxyopidae. It is found in North America.

References

External links

 

Oxyopidae
Articles created by Qbugbot
Spiders described in 1845
Spiders of North America